Luther Barrow (19 May 1876 – 15 February 1933) was a Barbadian cricketer. He played in three first-class matches for the Barbados cricket team in 1904/05 and 1905/06.

See also
 List of Barbadian representative cricketers

References

External links
 

1876 births
1933 deaths
Barbadian cricketers
Barbados cricketers
People from Saint Michael, Barbados